Netflix is an American media provider founded in 1997.

Netflix may also refer to:
 Netflix Animation, animation studio
 "Netflix" (song), 2013 song by 2 Chainz
 "Netflixxx", 2017 song by Brytiago and Bad Bunny